Emily Maitlis (born 6 September 1970) is a British journalist, documentary filmmaker, and former newsreader for the BBC. She was the lead anchor of the BBC Two news and current affairs programme Newsnight until the end of 2021. She is currently a presenter of the daily podcast, The News Agents on LBC Radio.

Early life and education 
Maitlis was born in Hamilton, Ontario, Canada to British Jewish parents; her paternal grandmother was a Jewish refugee who fled Nazi Germany. She is the daughter of Professor Peter Maitlis FRS, Emeritus Professor of Inorganic Chemistry at the University of Sheffield, and Marion Maitlis, a psychotherapist.

She was brought up in Sheffield, South Yorkshire. She was educated at King Edward VII School, Sheffield, and then studied English at Queens' College, Cambridge. As of 2019 she was the only Newsnight presenter not to have attended a private school.

Career

Early radio and television work in the Far East
Maitlis initially wanted to work as a director, prompted by her love for drama, but instead went into radio broadcasting. Prior to working in news, she was a documentary maker in Cambodia and China. She worked for the NBC network and was based in Hong Kong.

She spent six years in Hong Kong with TVB News and NBC Asia, initially as a business reporter creating documentaries, and then as a presenter in Hong Kong covering the collapse of the tiger economies in 1997. She also covered the transfer of sovereignty over Hong Kong with Jon Snow for Channel 4. She then moved to Sky News in the UK as a business correspondent, and then to BBC London News when the programme was relaunched in 2001.

BBC career
During 2005, Maitlis appeared as the question-master on the game show The National Lottery: Come And Have A Go. She was a regular presenter on BBC News Channel for a decade between 2006 and 2016, alongside Ben Brown and Jon Sopel. She also presented BBC Breakfast and from May 2006 until July 2007 presented STORYFix on BBC News, a light-hearted look at the week's news set to up-beat music.

In July 2007, Maitlis was appointed as a contributing editor to The Spectator magazine, an unpaid post. This had been approved by her immediate manager, the head of BBC Television News Peter Horrocks, but the decision was subsequently overturned by his superior, the BBC News director Helen Boaden.

In 2012, Maitlis presented the US 2012 election coverage on BBC One and the BBC News Channel alongside David Dimbleby, when incumbent US President Barack Obama and Mitt Romney were fighting for the presidency of the US. In 2016, she presented a news discussion programme called This Week's World on BBC Two, late afternoon on Saturdays.

Maitlis was a main presenter of Newsnight on BBC Two, alongside Kirsty Wark and Emma Barnett. She first joined the programme as a relief presenter in 2006, working her way up to be lead anchor of the programme following the departure of Evan Davis in 2018. After each show, before bed, she answered emails from viewers. In April 2019, she published  Airhead: The Imperfect Art of Making News, a book describing how television news is produced.

In November 2019, Maitlis interviewed Prince Andrew, Duke of York, about his relationship with American sex offender and paedophile Jeffrey Epstein, who died in August whilst awaiting trial on sex trafficking charges. The interview was broadcast on the BBC's Newsnight programme on 16 November 2019. Due in part to the disastrous fallout from Prince Andrew's performance during this interview, he resigned from his royal duties. In February 2020, her interview with Prince Andrew won Interview of the Year and Scoop of the Year awards at the 2020 RTS Television Journalism Awards, and Maitlis is reportedly making a scripted drama with Blueprint Pictures of this interview.

In 2019, Maitlis was amongst the highest paid BBC news and current affairs staff, receiving a salary between £260,000-£264,999. In July 2020 campaign group Defund the BBC ran billboards highlighting Maitlis' salary and that of Gary Lineker, with the heading "Are you still paying?"

In 2020, Maitlis began presenting a BBC podcast, Americast, with Jon Sopel, the BBC's North America editor. The podcasts originally focused on the 2020 election and contain analysis as well as an array of interviews from across the political scene. Americast received positive reviews and performed well becoming one of UK's most listened to podcast of any genre.

Post BBC career
On 22 February 2022, Maitlis announced her resignation from the BBC after signing with Global, the parent of LBC, to launch a daily podcast and joint radio show again with ex-BBC journalist, Jon Sopel.

In an address at the 2022 Edinburgh TV Festival, Maitlis cautioned journalists about self-censorship in the name of being reluctant to take on populist critics.

The News Agents, a daily podcast from Global Media presented by Maitlis, Jon Sopel and Lewis Goodall was launched on 30 August 2022. The opening edition, titled Trump – Prison or President?, focused on the FBI investigation into Donald Trump's handling of presidential documents, with Anthony Scaramucci, the former White House Director of Communications, appearing as a guest.

Allegations of  "lack of impartiality" 
In a Newsnight discussion concerning Brexit on 15 July 2019 it was alleged by a viewer that Maitlis had been "sneering and bullying" towards columnist Rod Liddle. Maitlis had accused Liddle of writing columns containing "consistent casual racism week after week", asking Liddle if he would describe himself as a racist. The BBC Executive Complaints Unit upheld the complaint against her, agreeing that she had been "persistent and personal" in her criticism of Liddle, thus "leaving her open to the charge [sic] that she had failed to be even-handed" in the discussion between Brexit-supporting Liddle and his anti-Brexit opponent Tom Baldwin. The Complaints Unit did not find that Maitlis had in fact failed to be even-handed.  Douglas Murray described the segment as "more of a drive-by shooting than an interview".

On 27 May 2020, the BBC said that Maitlis's introduction to Newsnight the night before, which discussed the allegations that the Prime Minister's chief adviser, Dominic Cummings, had contravened lockdown restrictions, "did not meet our standards of due impartiality". The BBC said in a statement: "The BBC must uphold the highest standards of due impartiality in its news output. Ms Maitlis started the show by declaring that Mr Cummings had 'broken the rules'". She did not present Newsnight on that day, asking to take the night off. On 3 September 2020, a report by the BBC's Editorial Complaints Unit also ruled against Maitlis in the matter, stating Maitlis' comments "went beyond an attempt to set out the programme agenda" and that the "definitive and at times critical nature of the language" had  "placed the presenter closer to one side of the debate" and thus "did not meet the required standards on accuracy or impartiality".

In February 2021, Maitlis was criticised over lacking impartiality after sharing a tweet by Piers Morgan which condemned the government.  Conservative Party politician Andrew Bridgen said the BBC journalist appeared to be ignoring impartiality guidelines.
In her August 2022 MacTaggart Lecture at the Edinburgh TV Festival, Maitlis reflected on the incident, saying that BBC editors were initially complimentary. The following day, after a complaint from the Prime Minister's office, the BBC apologised and removed the segment from its streaming service. In the lecture, Maitlis also questioned the promptness with which the BBC apologised.

Personal life 
Maitlis is married to investment manager Mark Gwynne, who is Catholic, whom she met while working in Hong Kong. She proposed to her husband while on holiday in Mauritius in 2000. They live in London and have two sons, Milo and Max. Maitlis is a keen runner and a WellChild Celebrity Ambassador. She speaks fluent French, Spanish and Italian, and some Mandarin.

Maitlis presented the 2012 World Jewish Relief's annual dinner at Guildhall, London. Her family is Jewish, although she has said that they are "not very practising".

Criminal stalker 
During 2002, it was reported that Maitlis had been stalked for over a decade by Edward Vines, a former platonic friend from her time at university, who would appear at her place of work. He admitted to harassing Maitlis, and was sentenced to four months' imprisonment, but released because of the time he had spent in detention on remand. A restraining order was imposed. In September 2016, Vines was sentenced to three years' imprisonment for breach of the restraining order in respect of Maitlis. In January 2018, Vines was jailed for 3 years and 9 months for breaching a restraining order forbidding him from contacting Maitlis. He admitted two charges of breaching the restraining order by sending two letters to Maitlis, as well as emails and letters to her mother in 2015. In September 2019, while a prisoner at HM Prison Ranby in Nottinghamshire, he pleaded not guilty to breaching an order restraining him from contacting Maitlis by writing a letter with the intention of having it sent to her. That led to his being sentenced, in February 2020, to a further three years' imprisonment.  In July 2022, Vines was convicted of attempting to break a restraining order by writing letters to Maitlis and her mother while in prison, for which he was subsequently received an 8-year prison sentence.

In a BBC Radio 5 Live interview, Maitlis likened the long-term harassment to having a chronic illness.

Awards 
In 2012 Maitlis received an honorary doctorate from Sheffield Hallam University. She won Broadcast Journalist of the Year at the 2017 London Press Club Awards and the Network Presenter of the Year award at the RTS Television Journalism Awards in 2019 and 2020. She received the German Hanns Joachim Friedrichs Award in 2020.

Publications

See also 
BBC News

References

External links 

BBC Press Office – Biography
Emily Maitlis at Debrett's People of Today
Guardian article, March 2006

1970 births
Living people
Alumni of Queens' College, Cambridge
BBC newsreaders and journalists
British broadcast news analysts
British people of German-Jewish descent
British reporters and correspondents
Journalists from Ontario
People educated at King Edward VII School, Sheffield
People from Hamilton, Ontario
People from Sheffield
Canadian emigrants to England
Canadian expatriates in England